Yevgeniy Mikhaylovich Abalakov (23 March 1948) was a Soviet mountaineer and sculptor. 

Abalakov was born in Yeniseysk.  He is noted for making the first ascent of the highest point of the Soviet Union - Stalin Peak (later renamed Communism Peak and eventually Ismoil Somoni Peak, its current name) (7,495 m) on 3 September 1933 as a member of the 26th detachment of the Tajik-Pamir Sovnarkom expedition. At the beginning of the German-Soviet War Abalakov went to the front. Abalakov died on 23 March, 1948 in Moscow, in obscure circumstances, while preparing for the ascent to the Victory Peak. His brother, Vitaly Abalakov, was also a famous mountaineer. 

Abalakov was buried at Novodevichy Cemetery in Moscow.

Bibliography
 (in Russian) Анатолий Ферапонтов. Восходители. Евгений Абалаков.
 (in Russian) Алексей Абалаков. Тайна гибели Евгения Абалакова - непрочитанные страницы истории Москва, МАКС Пресс 2000. г. in .pdf format
 (in Russian) Расстрельное время

References

External links
Photo-gallery of expedition 
Mountaineering in the U.S.S.R. By E.Beletsky 

Soviet mountain climbers
Soviet explorers
People from Yeniseysk Governorate
People from Yeniseysky District
1907 births
1948 deaths
Burials at Novodevichy Cemetery